Paolo Frascatore (born 4 January 1992) is an Italian footballer who plays for  club Turris.

Club career
Frascatore is a product of A.S. Roma youth sector.

On 13 July 2011 Frascatore left for Lega Pro Prima Divisione club Benevento, in temporary deal. In June 2012 Benevento excised the buy option but Roma also excised the counter-option by selling Mattia Montini for €200,000 and €50,000 cash to Benevento. Frascatore initially signed a 2-year contract, which was extended to 30 June 2016 circa 2013.

In the summer 2012 Roma sent him on loan to Serie B club Sassuolo. On 9 July 2013 Frascatore was signed by Serie B club Pescara. On 27 January 2014 Frascatore was signed by Reggina.

On 23 July 2014 Frascatore was signed by Lega Pro club Pistoiese in a temporary deal.

On 27 July 2015 he was signed by Reggiana in another temporary deal.

On 31 January 2019 he signed a 1.5-year contract with Triestina.

On 31 January 2020 he signed a 6-month contract with Padova.

On 6 October 2020 he joined Ternana.

On 6 August 2021 he joined Pescara.

On 3 August 2022, Frascatore signed a two-year contract with Turris.

International career
Frascatore started his national team career in 2007 summer training camp for born 1992–93 players. Frascatore played 4 friendlies for Italy U17 team and 2 substitute appearances in 2009 UEFA European Under-17 Football Championship qualification. Frascatore returned to national team in 2011 for 2 friendlies before 2011 UEFA European Under-19 Football Championship elite qualification.

Frascatore all 6 matches of 2011–12 Four Nations Tournament and also played the friendlies against Ghana, Macedonia and  Denmark.

On 15 August 2012 he made his debut with the Italy U-21 team, in a friendly match won 3–0 against Netherlands.

Honours
 Campionato Nazionale Primavera: 2011 (Roma U20)

References

External links
 FIGC 
 Football.it Profile 

Italian footballers
A.S. Roma players
Benevento Calcio players
A.C. Carpi players
U.S. Sassuolo Calcio players
Delfino Pescara 1936 players
Reggina 1914 players
F.C. Südtirol players
U.S. Triestina Calcio 1918 players
Calcio Padova players
Ternana Calcio players
S.S. Turris Calcio players
Serie B players
Serie C players
Association football defenders
Footballers from Rome
1992 births
Living people
Italy youth international footballers
Italy under-21 international footballers